The Alkonost is a legendary woman-headed bird in Slavic folklore. Alkonost is more likely an individual character, as was noted in some legends about this bird.

Folklore 
The name of the Alkonost came from a Greek demigoddess whose name was Alcyone. In Greek mythology, Alcyone was transformed by the gods into a kingfisher.

Alkonost makes amazingly beautiful sounds, and those who hear these sounds forget everything they know and want nothing more ever again. She lives in the underworld with her counterpart, the Sirin. The Alkonost lays her eggs on a beach and then rolls them into the sea. When the Alkonost's eggs hatch, a thunderstorm sets in and the sea becomes so rough that it becomes impossible to traverse. She is also the sister of other birds from Slavic mythology, such as Rarog and Stratim. 

According to folk tales, at the morning of the Apple Feast of the Saviour day, Sirin flies into the apple orchard and cries sadly. In the afternoon, the Alkonost flies to this place, beginning to rejoice and laugh. Alkonost brushes dew from her wings, granting healing powers to all fruits on the tree she is sitting on.

Gallery

In popular culture

 Alkonost is featured in the digital card game Mythgard (2019) as a rare minion in the Dreni faction.
 The RO-86 Alkonost, a heavy bomber resembling the Tu-160, is added as part of a downloadable content for the online mode of Grand Theft Auto V.
 The Alkonost is the name of the starship in The Boys from The Baltic Stars TTRPG game of Orbital Blues.
 Croatian singer Nina Kraljić that performed at the Eurovision Song Contest 2016 sings under the name of Alkonost of Balkan. 
 Alkonost is a Russian epic folk metal band formed in Naberezhnye Chelny, Tatarstan, Russia in 1995.

See also
Gamayun
Harpy
Sirin

References

External links

Russian folklore
Avian humanoids
Human-headed mythical creatures
Female legendary creatures
Slavic legendary creatures